Platynota labiosana is a species of moth of the family Tortricidae. It is found in the United States from southern California and Utah to Texas and southern Colorado, and south through Mexico to Guatemala.

The wingspan is about 15–21 mm. The forewings are narrowly stained with rich rust brown along the costa and termen and toward the base of the dorsum. The forewings are also dotted with dark fuscous and sprinkled with a few shining steely-metallic scales. The hindwings are bright ochreous. The main flight period is March to September, but adults have been recorded on wing year round in Texas.

References

Moths described in 1875
Platynota (moth)